The National Microbial Pathogen Data Resource was one of the eight Bioinformatics Resource Centers funded by the National Institutes of Allergy and Infectious Diseases, NIAID a component of the National Institutes of Health (NIH), which is an agency of the United States Department of Health and Human Services.  
The NMPDR was funded for five years from 2004 through a grant to co-PI's Rick Stevens from the Computation Institute at the University of Chicago, and Ross Overbeek at the Fellowship for the Interpretation of Genomes.

The NMPDR was initially tasked with annotating and curating the genomes of five pathogenic species of Bacteria, (Campylobacter, Listeria, Staphylococcus, Streptococcus, and Vibrio). However, after four years, the team were asked to also oversee the curation and annotation of the genomes of seven additional bacterial species (Chlamydia, Chlamydophila, Haemophilus, Mycoplasma, Neisseria,  Treponema, and Ureaplasma).

The flagship website, the National Microbial Pathogen Data Resource provides curated annotations in an environment for comparative analysis of genomes and biological subsystems.

In addition, the NMPDR team have also developed the Rapid Annotation using Subsystems Technology Server (RAST) for annotating and curating complete microbial genomes and the Metagenomics RAST for annotating metagenomes.

Note to NMPDR Users
As of January 2010, the bacterial organism originally covered by NMPDR under the BRC program have been transferred to PATRIC the Pathosystems Resource Integration Center.

Biology organizations